Ethelbert Ridge is a ridge composed of igneous rocks within the Fossil Bluff groups of sedimentary rocks located east-southeast of Mount Alfred. It was originally named "Saddleback Ridge" informally by British Antarctic Survey geologist Alastair Linn because of its pronounced saddleback appearance when viewed from the south. It was later formally named for Ethelbert, son of Ethelwulf, the Saxon King of the West Saxons and Kentishmen, and effectively King of England from 860–866. This continues the naming of features in the area after Saxon Kings of England.

References 

Ridges of Alexander Island